Scroggie Creek is a tributary of the Stewart River in Yukon, Canada. Every February, it forms part of the trail for the 1,000-mile Yukon Quest sled dog race. The creek has some placer gold deposits being actively mined.

See also
List of rivers of Yukon

References 

Rivers of Yukon